Need You Now may refer to:

 Need You Now (Lady Antebellum album), 2010
 "Need You Now" (Lady Antebellum song), the title song
 Need You Now (Plumb album), 2013
 "Need You Now (How Many Times)", the title song
 "Need You Now" (Hot Chip song), 2014
 "Need You Now" (Dean Lewis song), 2017
 "Need You Now", a 2011 song by Cut Copy from Zonoscope
 "Need You Now", a 2005 song by Soul Central

See also 
 I Need You Now (disambiguation)